The Arabian scops owl (Otus pamelae) is a small owl endemic to Saudi Arabia, Oman, and Yemen. The current population of the species is estimated to be about 60,000 individuals.

References

Arabian scops owl
Birds of the Arabian Peninsula
Arabian scops owl
Arabian scops owl